U.S. Highway 83 (US 83), dedicated as the Texas Vietnam Veterans Memorial Highway, is a U.S. Highway in the U.S. state of Texas that begins at US 77 (Interstate 69E, I-69E) in Brownsville and follows the Rio Grande to Laredo, then heads north through Abilene to the Oklahoma border north of Perryton, the seat of Ochiltree County.

In the Lower Rio Grande Valley, US 83 is a freeway that is at or close to interstate standards from Brownsville to Peñitas. In May 2013, the Texas Department of Transportation applied to the American Association of State Highway and Transportation Officials (AASHTO) to  designate this  section as I-2. After the Special Committee on Route Numbering initially disapproved the application, the AASHTO Board of Directors approved the I-2 designation, conditional on the concurrence of the Federal Highway Administration.

At a length of 906.5 mi (1,458.9 km), it is the longest numbered highway in Texas, besting the east west I-10, which runs 880 miles. It is also the longest stretch of a single US Highway within a single US state.

Route description
US 83's southern terminus is at a concurrency with I-69E/US 77 on the south side of Brownsville at the Brownsville – Veterans Port of Entry at the US/Mexico border. It remains co-signed with I-69E/US 77 until Harlingen, where I-69E/US 77 makes a sharp turn northward and US 83 maintains a westerly route to McAllen, concurrent with I-2 until Peñitas. From there, the highway roughly parallels the Rio Grande until Laredo where it makes a northwesterly turn toward Carrizo Springs, the seat of Dimmit County. The speed limit on US 83 is briefly 75 mph through Dimmit County.

Merging with I-35 just south of downtown, US 83 remains co-signed with the interstate until an exit at Botines. From there, it continues northward, intersecting with I-10 just south of Junction.

After continuing northward through several rural western Texas towns, US 83 then merges with US 84 east of Tuscola, where it makes a sharp turn back to the north. US 83/84 remains a co-signed route until Abilene, where US 84 turns to the northwest and US 83 remains northbound, merging with US 277 on the west side of the city.

After merging with US 380 in Aspermont and briefly sharing a route, US 83 continues northward, merging with US 62 in Paducah.

Major intersections

Gallery

See also

Business routes of U.S. Route 83 in Texas

Notes

References

External links

83
Transportation in Ochiltree County, Texas
Transportation in Lipscomb County, Texas
Transportation in Hemphill County, Texas
Transportation in Wheeler County, Texas
Transportation in Collingsworth County, Texas
Transportation in Childress County, Texas
Transportation in Cottle County, Texas
Transportation in King County, Texas
Transportation in Stonewall County, Texas
Transportation in Fisher County, Texas
Transportation in Jones County, Texas
Transportation in Taylor County, Texas
Transportation in Concho County, Texas
Transportation in Runnels County, Texas
Transportation in Menard County, Texas
Transportation in Kimble County, Texas
Transportation in Edwards County, Texas
Transportation in Kerr County, Texas
Transportation in Real County, Texas
Transportation in Uvalde County, Texas
Transportation in Zavala County, Texas
Transportation in Dimmit County, Texas
Transportation in Webb County, Texas
Transportation in Zapata County, Texas
Transportation in Starr County, Texas
Transportation in Hidalgo County, Texas
Transportation in Cameron County, Texas
Pharr, Texas
 Texas